Molí Nou-Ciutat Cooperativa is a railway station on the Llobregat–Anoia Line. It is located in the neighborhood of Molí Nou of the Sant Boi de Llobregat municipality, to the south-west of Barcelona, in Catalonia, Spain. It is served by Barcelona Metro line 8, Baix Llobregat Metro lines S33, S4 and S8, and commuter rail lines R5 and R6.

External links
 Information and photos of the station at trenscat.cat 
 Video on train operations at the station on YouTube

Railway stations in Spain opened in 2000
Barcelona Metro line 8 stations
Stations on the Llobregat–Anoia Line
Transport in Sant Boi de Llobregat
Railway stations in Baix Llobregat